Biomedical Chromatography is a monthly peer-reviewed scientific journal, published since 1986 by John Wiley & Sons. It covers research on the applications of chromatography and allied techniques in the biological and medical sciences. The editor-in-chief is Michael Bartlett (University of Georgia).

Abstracting and indexing 
The journal is abstracted and indexed in:
 Chemical Abstracts Service
 Scopus
 Science Citation Index
According to the Journal Citation Reports, the journal has a 2020 impact factor of 1.902.

Notable papers 
The highest cited papers published in this journal are:
 'High-throughput quantitative bioanalysis by LC/MS/MS', Volume 14, Issue 6, Oct 2000, Pages: 422 - 429, Jemal M. Cited 178 times
 'Analytical Chemistry and Biochemistry of D-Amino Acids', Volume 10, Issue 6, Nov-Dec 1996, Pages: 303-312, Imai K, Fukushima T, Santa T, et al. Cited 79 times
 'Fluorogenic and fluorescent labeling reagents with a benzofurazan skeleton', Volume 15, Issue 5, Aug 2001, Pages: 295-318, Uchiyama S, Santa T, Okiyama N, et al. Cited 74 times

References

External links 
 

Biochemistry journals
Publications established in 1986
Wiley (publisher) academic journals
English-language journals
Monthly journals